is a passenger railway station located in the city of Aki, Kōchi Prefecture, Japan. It is operated by the third-sector Tosa Kuroshio Railway with the station number "GN30".

Lines

Layout
The station consists of a side platform serving a single elevated track. There is no station building and the station is unstaffed but a shelter comprising both an open and an enclosed compartment is provided on the platform for waiting passengers. Access to the platform is by means of a flight of steps. Another waiting room is provided near the station entrance at the base of the elevated structure, together with parking lots and a bike shed.

Adjacent stations

Station mascot
Each station on the Asa Line features a cartoon mascot character designed by Takashi Yanase, a local cartoonist from Kōchi Prefecture. The mascot for Akano Station is a figure of a seagull dressed in a sailor suit named . The design is chosen because the line runs by the coast of the Pacific Ocean near the station and many seagulls can be seen in the area.

History

Passenger statistics
In fiscal 2011, the station was used by an average of 42 passengers daily.

Surrounding area
Japan National Route 55

See also 
List of railway stations in Japan

References

External links

See also
List of railway stations in Japan

Railway stations in Kōchi Prefecture
Railway stations in Japan opened in 2002
Aki, Kōchi